Nizar Sassi (born August 1, 1979) is a citizen of France who was detained by the United States in their naval base at Guantanamo Bay, Cuba.
His Guantanamo Internment Serial Number was 325.

Sassi was transferred to Guantanamo Bay in 2002.  He was repatriated to France on July 27, 2004.
Sassis remained in French custody until January 9, 2006. Although originally convicted in France, his trial was overturned and he was released in February 2009.

Sassi worked for the Venissieux Council. Venissieux is a suburb of Lyon.

According to his brother, Aymen, Nizar traveled to Pakistan to learn formal Arabic.

Security authorities claim Sassi travelled to Afghanistan in 2001 at the direction of, an alleged al Qaeda recruiter.
Mourad Benchellali and Sassi are alleged to have traveled to Afghanistan on forged passports.

Nizar Sassi and four other men stood trial on terrorism charges upon their return to France.
The five men's conviction were overturned in February 2009, because they had improperly been interviewed by France's intelligence officials, who were not authorized to act in a law enforcement role.
On February 17, 2010, the Court of Cassation, a higher court, ordered a re-trial of the five men.

Mourad Benchellali's McClatchy interview

On June 15, 2008, the McClatchy News Service published articles based on interviews with 66 former Guantanamo captives.  McClatchy reporters interviewed  Mourad Benchellali in France.
In his interview Mourad described how he and Nizar were tricked into traveling to Afghanistan by his older brother Menad Benchellali.  
He described how they found Afghanistan nothing like 
what they expected. He described not speaking Pashtu, Dari or Arabic, but they met some Algerians who spoke French, who suggested they attend a religious camp.

During his interview Mourad described what it was like to attend the training camp: a lot of praying; lectures on jihad; physical training; some weapons training, which did not include any weapons.
He said he and Nizar realized the only way to leave the camp early was to fall ill, so they pretended to fall ill, only to be sent to the camp infirmary.  But then he said Nizar really did fall ill, eventually losing 45 pounds.

Mourad described reconnecting with Nizar after his time at the camp was over, and asking the Algerians for help leaving Afghanistan.  
They told them they would have to wait a few weeks while arrangements were made, but then the USA attacked, and it was not possible to leave.

French trial

Nizar Sassi, and four other French citizens, were convicted in 2007 of "criminal association with a terrorist enterprise."
They had their convictions overturned on appeal on February 24, 2009.
Their convictions were overturned because they were based on interrogations conducted in Guantanamo, and the interrogations were conducted by French security officials, not law enforcement officials.

Sued American officials

Sassi and Mourad Benchellali sued several senior American officials, over the torture they were subjected to there.  Retired General Geoffrey Miller, a former commandant of the Guantanamo camp, as well as being the architect of torture and abuse at Abu Ghraib was called upon to testify.  Their lawyer, William Bourdon, characterized Miller's non-appearance as "a dual act of contempt against the French judiciary; he both refused to appear and to provide any explanation about his role and that of the US administration."  William Haynes, formerly the Pentagon's Chief Legal Counsel, was called to testify in October 2016.

Bibliography
(German) Nizar Sassi: Ich war gefangen in Guantanamo - Ein Ex-Häftling erzählt Heyne, München, 2006, 
(Italian) Nizar Sassi: Prigioniero 325, Delta Camp. Einaudi, Torino, 2006.  
(Spanish) Nizar Sassi: Guantanamo, Prisionero 325, Campo Delta.  Edaf S.A. 07/2006 
(Norwegian)  Nizar Sassi: Fange 325 : dokumentar fra Guantánamo-leiren  Oslo, Aschehoug, 2006.

See also
Mourad Benchellali
Imad Kanouni
Brahim Yadel
Karim Bourti
Khaled ben Mustafa
Redouane Khalid

References

External links
 McClatchy News Service - video

1979 births
French extrajudicial prisoners of the United States
French Muslims
French people of Tunisian descent
Living people
Guantanamo detainees known to have been released

fr:Nizar Sassi